Dark like the night. Karenina-2019 is a Russian 2019 short film directed by Radda Novikova and written by Aleksander Tsypkin. The film is loosely based on Leo Tolstoy's 1877 novel Anna Karenina and features the song "Dark like the night" by Boris Grebenshchikov.

Cast
 Yulia Peresild as Karenina
 Maksim Sukhanov as Karenin
Matvey Lykov as Vronsky
 Ingeborga Dapkunaite as journalist
 Konstantin Khabensky as train driver

Awards
The film received Best Music Video award at the Prague Independent Film Festival, and also received Best Short Film and Best Supporting Actor (Konstantin Khabensky) awards at the Vienna Independent Film Festival in 2019.

References

External links
 

Russian short films
Films based on Anna Karenina